The Kandahar Provincial Museum is a museum located in Kandahar, Afghanistan.

See also
 List of museums in Afghanistan

References 

Museums in Afghanistan